This article encompasses the 1860s Pacific typhoon seasons. The list is very incomplete; information on early typhoon seasons is patchy and relies heavily on individual observations of travellers and ships.  There were no comprehensive records kept by a central organisation at this early time.

1862 season 
A typhoon struck near Hong Kong on July 27, killing around 80,000 people.

1863 season 
There were four typhoons in the Western Pacific in 1863. A typhoon in December killed 49 people in the Philippines.

1864 season 
A typhoon in 1864 struck Hong Kong.

1865 season 
There were 8 tropical cyclones in the Western Pacific in 1865, 7 of which was a typhoon.

1866 season 
There were 5 tropical cyclones in the Western Pacific in 1866, 3 of which was a typhoon. A typhoon in June killed five people, and another typhoon in September killed four people.

1867 season 
There were five typhoons in the Western Pacific in 1867. A typhoon in September killed 1,800 people when it rose the waters of the Abra River.

1868 season 
There were two typhoons in the Western Pacific in 1868.

1869 season 
There were 3 tropical cyclones in the Western Pacific in 1869, 1 of which was a typhoon.

References 

 
Pacific typhoons
Pacific typhoons
Pacific typhoons
Pacific typhoons